Sol Daurella Comadrán (Barcelona, 1966) is a Spanish businesswoman, Chairwoman of Coca-Cola European Partners, a consumer goods company that produces and distributes an extensive range of nonalcoholic ready-to-drink beverages in 13 European countries including Spain, Portugal, Andorra, France, United Kingdom, Germany, Belgium, Netherlands, Norway and Switzerland.

Family history 
Sol Daurella was born into a family with a long business tradition. She is the granddaughter of the Spanish importer of salted cod Santiago Daurella Rull and daughter of the entrepreneur José Daurella Franco.

The Daurella family has been part of the Coca-Cola global system for more than 60 years. In 1951, they obtained the license to bottle and distribute the Coca-Cola beverage in Spain, creating the first Spanish bottler.

Also, she is first cousin of the catalan stylist Zenaida Bufill Comadrán, who had a relationship with Isak Andic, founder of Mango.

Education 
Sol Daurella studied in Switzerland and obtained her degree in Business Administration and her MBA from ESADE. She speaks four languages.

Career 
Sol Daurella is the Chairman of UK based Coca-Cola European Partners, created in May 2016, after the merger of Coca-Cola Iberian Partners, Coca-Cola Enterprises and the German bottler. Coca-Cola European Partners is listed on the Amsterdam, New York, London and Madrid stock exchanges. Before her appointment as Chairman of Coca-Cola European Partners, she had been CEO at Coca-Cola Iberian Partners. She is also CEO and Chairman of Cobega.

Sol Daurella is also a director of other Coca-Cola bottlers such as Equatorial Coca-Cola Bottling Company partially owned by TCCC which operates in 12 countries in Western and Northern Africa.

In addition, she is co-Chair of Grupo Cacaolat, a dairy company which produces cocoa milkshakes and is based in Barcelona.

She began her professional career at Mac Group, a strategic consultancy firm, before joining the Coca-Cola System in 1992.

Board member 
She has contributed her experience as a member of the Board to a number of companies in the banking, construction and energy sectors, as well as to other consumer goods companies.

Since November 2014, she has been a board member of Banco Santander, ranked Eurozone's largest bank by market value. In addition, she is Honorary Consul for Iceland and is also involved with nonprofit organizations dedicated to cancer research, health and well-being and education.

References 

Coca-Cola people
Spanish chairpersons of corporations
Spanish business executives
1966 births
Living people
Members of the Board of Directors of the Banco Santander